Apep is a god in Ancient Egyptian mythology.

Apep or APEP may also refer to:

 Apep (star system), a triple star system
 APEP FC, a football club based in Kyperounta, Cyprus
 APEP Pelendriou, a football club based in Pelendriou, Cyprus